The Heart of Paula is a 1916 American silent film directed by Julia Crawford Ivers and William Desmond Taylor, starring Lenore Ulric. This film survives at the Library of Congress.

As briefly-described in a 1916 publication, this five-reel film is a "story of romance and adventure in Mexico.  Lenore Ulrich is the Spanish girl who loves an American engineer."

Two endings were prepared for the film—one happy and one tragic.  This was a first, and critics were asked to vote for which ending they preferred, but the vote ended in a tie.

Cast
Lenore Ulric as Paula Figueroa
Velma Lefler as Claire Pachmann
Jack Livingston as Stephen Pachmann
Forrest Stanley as Bruce McLean
Howard Davies as Emiliano Pacheco
Herbert Standing as Mr. Adams
Antonio Corsi as Dieguez

References

External links

1916 films
American black-and-white films
American silent feature films
Paramount Pictures films
1916 drama films
Silent American drama films
Surviving American silent films
Films directed by William Desmond Taylor
Films directed by Julia Crawford Ivers
1910s American films